The 17th SS Police Regiment was initially named the 17th Police Regiment (Polizei-Regiment 17) when it was formed in 1942 from existing Order Police units (Ordnungspolizei) for security duties on the Eastern Front. It was redesignated as an SS unit in early 1943.

Formation and organization
The regiment was ordered formed in July 1942 in Russia. Police Battalion 42 (Polizei-Batallion 42) and Police Battalion 74 were redesignated as the regiment's first and second battalions, respectively. Police Battalion 69 was intended to become its third Battalion, but it became II Battalion of the 28th Police Regiment Todt instead. I Battalion of that regiment replaced it as III Battalion. All of the police regiments were redesignated as SS police units on 24 February 1943.

Notes

References
 Arico, Massimo. Ordnungspolizei: Encyclopedia of the German Police Battalions, Stockholm: Leandoer and Ekholm (2010). 
Blood, Phillip W. Hitler's Bandit Hunters: The SS and the Nazi Occupation of Europe, Washington, D.C.: Potomac Books (2006). 
Tessin, Georg & Kannapin, Norbert. Waffen-SS under Ordnungspolizei im Kriegseinsatz 1939–1945: Ein Überlick anhand der Feldpostübersicht, Osnabrück, Germany: Biblio Verlag (2000).